Maclean Hall or MacLean hall may refer to:

 MacLean Hall (University of the Ozarks)
 Maclean Hall, a building of the Pentacrest, at the University of Iowa
 Maclean Hall, a former residence at the University of Chicago

Architectural disambiguation pages